TransManche Link (Cross Channel Link) or TML was a British-French construction consortium responsible for building the Channel Tunnel under the English Channel between Cheriton in England, and Coquelles in France.

History
In April 1985 the British and French governments invited proposals for the construction of a link between the two countries to be privately funded. In January 1986 the two governments selected the Channel Tunnel Group/France Manche proposal for the construction of two undersea tunnels. At Canterbury Cathedral on 12 February 1986 the governments signed a treaty approving construction of the Channel Tunnel. In March the concession for the operation of the tunnel was given to Channel Tunnel Group (CTG) and France Manche (FM).

Following the award of this concession CTG was subsumed by the newly formed Eurotunnel plc and FM was similarly replaced with Eurotunnel SA, together these formed the Eurotunnel Group.

In July 1985 the British contractors formed Translink Contractors and the French consortium formed Transmanche Construction. On 18 October 1985 these two groups were merged to create TransManche Link (TML). TML was thus contracted to build the tunnel for its customer, Eurotunnel, who would own and operate it. TML senior management were employees of the partner companies seconded to the new organisation.

In October 1986 Eurotunnel was partially floated and the contractors and banks no longer exercised control over the company. Beginning in 1987 relations between TML and Eurotunnel deteriorated, with significant and increasingly public rows erupting over cost and programme management.

With the completion of the Channel Tunnel TML ceased to exist.

Organisation

The participants were as follows:

Channel Tunnel Group (later Translink Contractors)
Balfour Beatty
Costain
Tarmac Construction
Taylor Woodrow Construction
Wimpey International Construction
NatWest
Midland Bank

France Manche (later Transmanche Construction) 
Bouygues
Dumez
Société Auxiliaire d’Entreprise
Société Générale d’Entreprises
Spie Batignolles
Crédit Lyonnais
Banque Nationale de Paris
Banque Indosuez

References

Channel Tunnel
Construction and civil engineering companies of the United Kingdom
Tunnelling organizations
Construction and civil engineering companies established in 1985
British companies established in 1985
Construction and civil engineering companies disestablished in the 20th century